Dave Cohen is a writer for television and radio, as well as a columnist for The Huffington Post. He has written for Have I Got News For You and contributes musically to the award-winning and hugely popular Horrible Histories.

Career

Writing
Cohen is a prolific writer for television and radio as well as contributing columns to NME, Chortle and The Huffington Post.

He has written for BBC Radio 4 including The Best of British, Dead Ringers which won a Sony Gold Award 2001, The Sunday Format, The News Quiz and 15 Minute Musical which he was also a co-creator and won the 2009 Writer's Guild Best Radio Comedy Show, to name a few. He also wrote for BBC Radio 5's The Treatment and They Came From Nowhere.

Cohen has written for a number of television shows including the Rory Bremner Show, Spitting Image, Eleven O'Clock Show, Not Going Out and My Family. He has been a long time writer for Have I Got News For You and Horrible Histories which has won a variety of awards including Best Sketch Show, Best Comedy Show at the Children's BAFTAs and Best British Comedy Show.

He was a columnist for NME/The Face in 1984–5, The Guardian in 2009 and has been writing for The Huffington Post since 2011.

Theatre, film and television performance
Cohen began performing in 1984, at Edinburgh Fringe as a stand-up comedian. He was nominated for a Perrier Comedy Award for Tuxedo Junta, which he wrote and performed with Paul B. Davies. He went on to co-found The Comedy Store Players and was a member of Comedy Store Cutting Edge. From 1994 to 2000 he occasionally performed for Guns'n'Moses. After nearly a decade of absence, he returned to perform in My Life As A Footnote and most recently, in 2012, performed Songs in A Flat.

In television, Cohen has acted in 15 Storeys High and Sixty Six and in 2004 was in Suzie Gold.

Radio
From 1991 through to 1999, Cohen contributed to BBC Radio 1's Loose Talk and Songlines, of which he was co-creator. He was also a recurring guest for BBC Radio 4's Loose Ends. His own series, Travels With My Anti Semitism, appeared in 1999.

References

External links
Dave Cohen's website

Living people
British male screenwriters
Year of birth missing (living people)